The 2005 FIA GT Championship season was the 9th season of FIA GT Championship motor racing. It featured a series of races for GT1 Grand Touring and GT2 Series Grand Touring cars, the former more powerful and highly developed and the latter remaining closer to the production models on which they were based. Additionally cars from National Championships (Group 2) and
from Single-make Cups (Group 3) were permitted to participate in championship races but could not score points towards the various awards.  
The championship itself consisted of a GT1 Championship for Drivers, a GT1 Championship for Teams, a GT2 Cup for Drivers and a GT2 Cup for Teams. A Manufacturers Cup was also awarded in both classes. The championship season began on 10 April 2005 and ended on 25 November 2005 after 11 races.

Schedule

Entries

GT1

GT2

Season results

Overall winners in bold.

Drivers Championship
Points were awarded at each round to the top eight finishers in both the GT1  & GT2 classes on a 10 8 6 5 4 3 2 1 basis except for the Spa 24 Hour event were “double points” were awarded in three parts as follows:
 5 4 3 2.5 2 1.5 1 0.5 according to the classification after six hours
 5 4 3 2.5 2 1.5 1 0.5 according to the classification after twelve hours
 10 8 6 5 4 3 2 1 according to the classification at the end of the race

GT1 Standings
The GT1 Championship for Drivers was awarded to Gabiele Gardel of Switzerland, who drove a Ferrari 550-GTS Maranello for the Larbre Competition team.

GT2 Standings
The GT2 Cup for Drivers was awarded jointly to German drivers Mike Rockenfeller and Marc Lieb who shared a Porsche 996 GT3 RSR entered by GruppeM Racing.

Teams Championship
Points were awarded at each round to the top eight finishers in both the GT1  & GT2 classes on a 10 8 6 5 4 3 2 1 basis except for the Spa 24 Hour event were “double points” were awarded in three parts as follows:
 5 4 3 2.5 2 1.5 1 0.5 according to the classification after six hours
 5 4 3 2.5 2 1.5 1 0.5 according to the classification after twelve hours
 10 8 6 5 4 3 2 1 according to the classification at the end of the race

GT1 Standings

GT2 Standings

Manufacturers Cup
Points were awarded at each round to the top eight finishers in both the GT1  & GT2 classes on a 10 8 6 5 4 3 2 1 basis except for the Spa 24 Hour event were “double points” were awarded in three parts as follows:
 5 4 3 2.5 2 1.5 1 0.5 according to the classification after six hours
 5 4 3 2.5 2 1.5 1 0.5 according to the classification after twelve hours
 10 8 6 5 4 3 2 1 according to the classification at the end of the race

GT1 Standings

GT2 Standings

References

External links

 Official FIA GT homepage
 Images from the 2005 FIA GT Championship Retrieved from www.motorsport.com on 21 May 2009
 Round results from the 2005 FIA GT Championship Retrieved from www.teamdan.com on 21 May 2009
 2005 FIA GT Championship Classifications Retrieved from www.fia.com on 22 May 2009

FIA GT Championship
 
FIA GT Championship seasons